The Gymnastics competitions in the 1983 Summer Universiade were held in Edmonton, Canada.

Competition Format
The artistic gymnastics competition was carried out in three stages:

 Competition I - The team competition/qualification round in which all gymnasts, including those who were not part of a team, performed both compulsory and optional exercises. The combined scores of all team members determined the final score of the team. The thirty-six highest scoring gymnasts in the all-around qualified to the individual all-around competition. The six highest scoring gymnasts on each apparatus qualified to the final for that apparatus.
 Competition II - The individual all-around competition, in which those who qualified from Competition I performed exercises on each apparatus. The final score of each gymnast was composed of half the points earned by that gymnast during Competition I and all of the points earned by him or her in Competition II.
 Competition III - The apparatus finals, in which those who qualified during Competition I performed an exercise on the individual apparatus on which he or she had qualified. The final score of each gymnast was composed of half the points earned by that gymnast on that particular apparatus during Competition I and all of the points earned by him or her on that particular apparatus in Competition III.

Each country was limited to three gymnasts in the all-around final and two gymnasts in each apparatus final.

Men's Event

Women's Event

References

External links
 A little known Romanian gymnast stole a bit of...

1983 Summer Universiade
Gymnastics at the Summer Universiade
1983 in gymnastics